Erie County Sheriff's Office could refer to several sheriffs departments in the United States, including:

Erie County, New York Sheriff's Office
Erie County, Ohio Sheriff's Office
Erie County, Pennsylvania Sheriff's Office